Myron richardsonii, also known as Richardson's mangrove snake, is a species of venomous homalopsid snake native to the marine waters of eastern Indonesia and northern Australia. The specific epithet richardsonii honours Sir John Richardson, collector of the original specimen.

Description
The snake grows to an average of about 40 cm in length, and to a maximum of 60 cm.

Behaviour
The species is viviparous, with an average litter size of six. It feeds on fishes.

Distribution and habitat
The species’ distribution encompasses the coasts around the Arafura Sea, including the Aru Islands and southern New Guinea as well as northern Australia from the Kimberley eastwards to the Gulf of Carpentaria. Habitat includes coasts, estuaries and tidal rivers.

References

richardsonii
Snakes of Australia
Reptiles of Western Australia
Reptiles of the Northern Territory
Reptiles of Queensland
Snakes of New Guinea
Reptiles of Indonesia
Taxa named by John Edward Gray
Reptiles described in 1849